The 1923–24 season was the 51st season of competitive football in Scotland and the 34th season of the Scottish Football League. A Third Division was introduced adding to Division One and Division Two.

Scottish League Division One 

Champions: Rangers
Relegated: Clyde, Clydebank

Scottish League Division Two 

Promoted: St. Johnstone, Cowdenbeath 
Relegated: Vale of Leven, Lochgelly United

Scottish League Division Three 

Promoted: Arthurlie, East Stirlingshire

Scottish Cup 

Airdrieonians were winners of the Scottish Cup after a 2–0 win over last season's finalists Hibernian.

Other honours

National

County 

. *replay

Highland League

Junior Cup 
Parkhead were winners of the Junior Cup after a 3–1 win over Baillieston in the final replay.

Scotland national team 

Key:
 (H) = Home match
 (A) = Away match
 BHC = British Home Championship

See also 
1923–24 Aberdeen F.C. season

Notes and references

External links 
 Scottish Football Historical Archive

 
Seasons in Scottish football